Carolyn Fiona Labey is a Jersey politician who was first sworn in as a Deputy for Grouville on 12 December 2002. She was re-elected as Deputy in 2005, 2008 and 2011.

She is Assistant Minister for Economic Development and Assistant Minister for Planning and Environment.

Political career
Labey was first elected as a Deputy in the parish of Grouville, in the Jersey general election of 2002 with 774 votes.  She stood against one other candidate, Patricia Anne Picot, who achieved 397 votes.

References

External links
Record of service to the States
LABEY, Carolyn Fiona page on vote.je
Parish of Grouville

Living people
Deputies of Jersey
Jersey women in politics
21st-century British women politicians
Year of birth missing (living people)
Government ministers of Jersey